Câmpia may refer to several villages in Romania:

 Câmpia, a village in Socol Commune, Caraş-Severin County
 Câmpia, a village in Bocşa commune, Sălaj County

See also 
 Câmpeni (disambiguation)
 Câmpulung (disambiguation)
 Câmpu River (disambiguation)
 Câmpu Mare (disambiguation)